Inside of Me may refer to:

 Inside of Me (film), a 2009 short film directed by Robert X. Golphin
 "Inside of Me" (Dead by Sunrise song), 2009
 "Inside of Me" (Vamps song), 2016
 "Inside of Me", a song by 3 Doors Down from Us and the Night, 2016
 "Inside of Me", a song by Benny Benassi from Hypnotica, 2003
 "Inside of Me", a song by Madonna from Bedtime Stories, 1994